The Rulers of Bamburgh (Old English: Bebbanburh; Old Irish: Dún Guaire; Brittonic: Din Guairoi) were significant regional potentates in what is now northern England and south-eastern Scotland during the Viking Age. Sometimes referred to in modern sources as the Earldom of Bamburgh, their polity existed for roughly two centuries, beginning after the attacks on the Anglo-Saxon Kingdom of Northumbria by the Vikings in the later ninth century, and ending after the Norman Conquest later in the eleventh century. In Scottish and Irish sources of the period the Bamburgh 'earldom' is referred to as the kingship of the Northern English (or the North English kingdom), or simply of the 'Saxons'. 

In essence, Bamburgh and the surrounding region (the former realm of Bernicia), the northern component of Northumbria, was ruled in succession by a shadowy series of 'kings', 'earls' (Latin duces) and 'high-reeves' (from Old English heah-gerefa). Most of these were descended from Eadwulf I of Bamburgh, thereafter called the Eadwulfings or House of Bamburgh. Several of these men commanded the whole of Northumbria, and their jurisdiction is also sometimes referred to also as the earldom of Northumbria (not to be confused with the southern ealdordom of Northumbria based at York).

Post-867 Kings in English Northumbria

Eadwulfing line or 'House of Bamburgh'

Post-Eadwulfing

Notes

References

See also
Earl of Northumbria